Bloodsucking Cinema is a 2007 documentary film about vampire films and it has horror directors talking about the genre. It is an Anchor Bay Entertainment film and it aired on Starz' Fear Fest.

References

External links
Video Business

2007 television films
2007 films
American documentary television films
Canadian horror television films
Documentary films about films
Canadian vampire films
Documentary films about horror
2000s English-language films
2000s Canadian films